Nelson Flavio Debenedet (born December 31, 1947 in Cordenons, Italy and raised in Copper Cliff, Ontario) is an Italian-born Canadian retired ice hockey forward. He was the first Italian-born player in the NHL.

Debenedet began his National Hockey League career with the Detroit Red Wings, playing his last season at top level with the Pittsburgh Penguins.

Career statistics

External links

1947 births
Living people
Detroit Red Wings players
Fort Wayne Komets players
Hershey Bears players
Ice hockey people from Ontario
Italian ice hockey players
People from the Province of Pordenone
Pittsburgh Penguins players
Sportspeople from Greater Sudbury
Toronto Varsity Blues ice hockey players
Undrafted National Hockey League players
Virginia Wings players
Canadian ice hockey defencemen
Sportspeople from Friuli-Venezia Giulia